Khirer Putul is a children's fantasy novel written by Abanindranath Tagore in 1896. Khirer Putul is considered a masterpiece and landmark by writers in Bengali language children's literature. Khirer Putul is a simple and touching tale about the sugar doll, the fate of Duorani and  a tricky and extraordinary monkey. Aadi Brahmosamaj press first published this book. Later on, it was translated into other languages. The story was adapted into a film of the same name by Indian writer and director Purnendu Pattrea in 1976. Khirer Putul, an Indian television soap opera based on the novel aired on Zee Bangla in 2020.

It was also adapted into a play by the Indian theatre group Nandikar in 2017, with Anindita Chakraborty as its director.

Plot 
The king of Deepnagar had two queens Suo Rani and Duo Rani. The king gave Suo Rani 7 palaces, 700 female slaves, best ornaments from 7 kingdoms, 7 gardens, 7 chariots. He neglected Duo Rani and gave her a broken home, a deaf and dumb maid, torn clothes and a dirty bed.

Translations 
The work has been translated into several languages:
 French – La poupée de fromage
Swedish – Ostdockan
English – The Make-Believe Prince

Development 
Abanindranath who was Rabindranath Tagore's nephew found this story in Rabindranath's wife Mrinalini Devi's diary after her death. The novel is based on the story written in her diary. The illustrations were done by Abanindranath Tagore.

Analysis
According to scholar Sanjay Sircar, the tale can be classified in the Aarne-Thompson-Uther Index as tale type ATU 459, "The Make-Believe Son (Daughter)", a tale type "widespread throughout North India and other Asian areas, but never found in Europe". Similarly, German scholar  listed four Iranian variants of the same type, which he named Der Prinz verliebt sich in eine Puppe ("The Prince falls in love with a Doll").

References

External links
Illustration By Ashish Sengupta

Bengali-language literature
19th-century Indian novels
Indian fairy tales
Indian children's novels
1890s children's books
Children's fantasy novels
Indian folklore
Indian literature
Indian legends
Indian novels adapted into films
Indian novels adapted into plays
Indian novels adapted into television shows
ATU 400-459